St. Leo may refer to one of several saints named Leo, including:
 Pope Leo I (d. 461), pope and saint
 Pope Leo II (d. 683), pope and saint
 Pope Leo III (d. 816), pope and saint
 Pope Leo IV (d. 855), pope and saint
 Pope Leo IX (d. 1054), pope and saint
 , France
 Saint Leo of Catania otherwise Saint Leo the Thaumaturge (d. 785), saint and bishop of Catania in Sicily
 Saint Leo of Montefeltro (d. 366), bishop of Montefeltro
 Saint Leo of Patara (d. 260), early Christian martyr

Leo